Diodora benguelensis is a species of sea snail, a marine gastropod mollusk in the family Fissurellidae, the keyhole limpets and slit limpets.

References

External links
 To World Register of Marine Species

Fissurellidae
Gastropods described in 1846